Anna-Lena Grönefeld and Patty Schnyder were the defending champions, but lost in the first round to Iveta Benešová and Barbora Záhlavová-Strýcová.

Seeds

Draw

Draw

External links
 Draw

Porsche Tennis Grand Prix - Doubles
Porsche Tennis Grand Prix